Erkki Antero Haukipuro (18 February 1921, Raahe - 27 September 2001, Oulu) was a Finnish farmer and politician. He served as Minister of Agriculture from 4 September 1972 to 31 July 1973. He was a member of the Parliament of Finland from 1966 to 1973. He was the Governor of Oulu Province from 1973 to 1986.

References

1921 births
2001 deaths
People from Raahe
Finnish Lutherans
Centre Party (Finland) politicians
Ministers of Agriculture of Finland
Members of the Parliament of Finland (1966–70)
Members of the Parliament of Finland (1970–72)
Members of the Parliament of Finland (1972–75)
Finnish military personnel of World War II
20th-century Lutherans